In men's association football, national associations organize annual championships for their member clubs. The winners of those are declared champions of the country. Normally, as per tradition, the club is presented a title and the players and staff receive winners' medals.

Domestic champions usually gain access to continental leagues for the next season.

Current champions
Below are lists of the current or last known champions of the nations that are members, full or associate, of one of FIFA's six continental confederations: AFC (Asia), CAF (Africa), CONCACAF (North and Central America and the Caribbean), CONMEBOL (South America), OFC (Oceania), and UEFA (Europe). The great majority of those nations are also members of FIFA itself; where this is not the case, this is noted.

Former and defunct championships are not included.

AFC
Countries where two top-level leagues coexist, and which thus have two champions, are Nepal (the Nepal Super League and the Martyr's Memorial A-Division League) and Palestine (the West Bank Premier League and the Gaza Strip Premier League).

Northern Mariana Islands currently uses the split-season format: "Spring" and "Fall", and thus championship is awarded twice within a calendar year.

Northern Mariana Islands also does not have FIFA membership.

CAF
Réunion and Zanzibar are associate members of CAF and do not have FIFA membership.

CONCACAF
In Saint Kitts and Nevis two top-level leagues coexist (the SKNFA Premier League and the N1 League) and thus the country has two champions.

Belize, Costa Rica, El Salvador, Guatemala, Haiti, Honduras, Mexico, Nicaragua and Panama currently use the split-season format: "Apertura" and "Clausura" ("Opening" and "Closing" in Belize, "Ouverture" and "Clôture" in Haiti), and thus championship is awarded twice within a calendar year.

Bonaire, French Guiana, Guadeloupe, Martinique, Saint Martin and Sint Maarten do not have FIFA membership.

CONMEBOL
Bolivia, Colombia and Paraguay currently use the split-season format: "Apertura" and "Clausura" ("Apertura" and "Finalización" in Colombia), and thus championship is awarded twice within a calendar year.

OFC
In Vanuatu two top-level leagues coexist (the Port Vila Football League and the VFF Champions League), and thus the country has two champions.

Kiribati and Tuvalu are associate members of OFC and do not have FIFA membership.

UEFA
One UEFA member, Liechtenstein, does not currently organise a domestic championship.

Notes

Historical records

Longest streaks
The below tables list the teams with the longest streaks of consecutive titles, current or historical.

Active

Overall

Notes

Most championships
The below table lists the teams with the most championship titles overall. For some clubs sources may disagree about the numbers of titles won, due to differing views on the legitimacy of some championships or on the historical continuities of clubs that folded and were revived, merged with or split from other clubs, or were rebranded.

Notes

See also
List of association football competitions
List of top-division football clubs in AFC countries
List of top-division football clubs in CAF countries
List of top-division football clubs in CONCACAF countries
List of top-division football clubs in CONMEBOL countries
List of top-division football clubs in OFC countries
List of top-division football clubs in UEFA countries

References

RSSSF lists of champions